The 2011 AFC Asian Cup was the 15th edition of the men's AFC Asian Cup, a quadrennial international football tournament organised by the Asian Football Confederation (AFC). The finals were held in Qatar from 7 to 29 January 2011. It was the fifteenth time the tournament has been held, and the second time it has been hosted by Qatar, the other being the 1988 AFC Asian Cup. Japan won the cup after a 1–0 win against Australia, and earned the right to compete in the 2013 FIFA Confederations Cup in Brazil as the representative from AFC.

A television viewing audience of 484 million in 80 countries across the Asia-Pacific region, Europe, North America and North Africa witnessed Japan defeat Australia 1–0 in the final.

Host selection 
Qatar, India and Iran all lodged interest in hosting the 2011 AFC Asian Cup, while Australia also considered making a late bid. Qatar officially submitted their bid on 19 June 2006, while India withdrew their interest and Iran failed to submit proper documentation for their bid on time.

Qatar was announced as host nation on 29 July 2007, during the 2007 AFC Asian Cup in Jakarta, Indonesia.  Due to FIFA regulations stating that confederation events can be hosted either in January or July, and July being peak summer heat in the Middle East, 2011 Asian Cup took place in January of that year.

Qualification

The teams finishing first, second and third in the 2007 AFC Asian Cup, and the host nation for the 2011 competition, received automatic byes to the finals. They were joined by the top two finishers in each of five qualifying groups. The AFC Challenge Cup acted as a further qualification competition for eligible countries within the emerging and developing category of member associations. The winners of the AFC Challenge Cup competitions in 2008 and 2010 qualified automatically to the 2011 AFC Asian Cup finals. These two winners were India and North Korea. It was India's first play for the Asian Cup since 1984, and North Korea's first since 1992.

The final day of qualification was 3 March 2010.

List of qualified teams

Notes:
1 Bold indicates champion for that year
2 Italic indicates host

Draw
The draw for the AFC Asian Cup 2011 was held on 23 April 2010 in Doha, Qatar. Qatar were seeded among the top group.

Seeding
Seeding was announced on 22 April 2010. Qatar were automatically placed in Group A. FIFA rankings of April 2010 are given in brackets.

Venues

Members of the AFC Organising Committee for AFC Asian Cup 2011 have agreed the use of five stadiums for the 2011 tournament.

Officials
12 referees and 24 assistants were selected for the tournament, along with three stand-by referees:

Standby referees

Squads

Each country's final squad of 23 players was submitted by 28 December 2010.

Group stage
All times are Arabian Standard Time (AST) – UTC+3

Tie-breaking criteria
The teams are ranked according to points (3 points for a win, 1 point for a tie, 0 points for a loss) and tie breakers are in following order:
Greater number of points obtained in the group matches between the teams concerned;
Goal difference resulting from the group matches between the teams concerned;
Greater number of goals scored in the group matches between the teams concerned;
Goal difference in all the group matches;
Greater number of goals scored in all the group matches;
Kicks from the penalty mark if only two teams are involved and they are both on the field of play;
Fewer score calculated according to the number of yellow and red cards received in the group matches; (1 point for each yellow card, 3 points for each red card as a consequence of two yellow cards, 3 points for each direct red card, 4 points for each yellow card followed by a direct red card)
Drawing of lots.

Group A

Group B

Group C

Group D

Knockout stage

{{Round8-with third
|widescore=yes
|RD1=Quarter-finals
|RD2=Semi-finals
|RD3=Final
|Consol=Third place

|21 January – Doha (Khalifa)||2||1
|22 January – Doha (Suheim)| |1||0
|21 January – Doha (Thani)||3||2
|22 January – Doha (Jassim)||0||1|25 January – Doha (Khalifa)||0||6|25 January – Doha (Thani)| (pen.)|2 (3)||2 (0)

|29 January – Doha (Khalifa)||0| |1|28 January – Doha (Jassim)||2||3}}

All times are Arabian Standard Time (AST) – UTC+3

Quarter-finals

Semi-finals

Third place playoff

Final

Statistics
Goalscorers
With five goals, Koo Ja-cheol was the top scorer in the tournament. In total, 90 goals were scored by 60 different players, with three of them credited as own goals.5 goals: Koo Ja-cheol4 goals: Ismail Abdul-Latif
 Ji Dong-won3 goals: Harry Kewell
 Ryoichi Maeda
 Shinji Okazaki
 Alexander Geynrikh2 goals: Tim Cahill
 Mile Jedinak
 Faouzi Mubarak Aaish
 Sunil Chhetri
 Shinji Kagawa
 Yusef Ahmed
 Fábio César Montezine
 Abdelrazaq Al Hussain
 Odil Ahmedov
 Ulugbek Bakayev
 Server Djeparov1 goal: David Carney
 Brett Emerton
 Brett Holman
 Robbie Kruse
 Saša Ognenovski
 Carl Valeri
 Deng Zhuoxiang
 Hao Junmin
 Yu Hai
 Zhang Linpeng
 Gouramangi Singh
 Arash Afshin
 Karim Ansarifard
 Iman Mobali
 Mohammad Nouri
 Gholamreza Rezaei
 Karrar Jassim
 Younis Mahmoud
 Makoto Hasebe
 Keisuke Honda
 Hajime Hosogai
 Masahiko Inoha
 Tadanari Lee
 Maya Yoshida
 Hassan Abdel Fattah
 Baha'a Abdul-Rahman
 Odai Al-Saify
 Bashar Bani Yaseen
 Bader Al-Mutawa
 Mohamed El Sayed
 Bilal Mohammed
 Sebastián Soria
 Taisir Al-Jassim
 Hwang Jae-won
 Ki Sung-yueng
 Son Heung-min
 Yoon Bit-garam
 Firas Al-Khatib
 Mohamed Al Zeno
 Maksim Shatskikh1 own goal: Ali Diab (for Jordan)2 own goals: Walid Abbas (for Iraq and Iran)

Awards
The AFC selected the MVP, top goalscorer, fair play award and four quality players of the tournament. They didn't officially announce the all-star team of this tournament.Most Valuable Player Keisuke HondaTop Goalscorer Koo Ja-cheolFair Play AwardQuality Players Keisuke Honda
 Park Ji-sung
 Harry Kewell
 Server Djeparov

Final standings

|-
| colspan="11"| Eliminated in the quarter-finals|-

|-
| colspan="11"| Eliminated in group stage'''
|-

|}

Marketing

Official match ball
The Nike Total 90 Tracer was the official match ball of the tournament.

Official mascot 
Official mascot were Saboog, Tmbki, Freha, Zkriti and Tranaa.

Official song 

For marketing of the event, the organisers opted for the slogan "Yalla Asia" with a song sung by international artists Jay Sean and Karl Wolf, featuring Radhika Vekaria.
Yalla Asia was composed and written by Radhika Vekaria, Max Herman and Zoulikha El Fassi. Max Herman produced the record for Zoul Projects 2011. The music video features Football Free Stylers Abbas Farid and Soufiane Touzani.

The music video was released on January 9, 2011.

Controversies
The 2011 Asian Cup was not without controversies as concerns were risen about the extremely low crowds at most games not featuring hosts Qatar. The average attendance was just 12,006, much lower than the previous AFC Asian Cup tournaments. North Korea and the United Arab Emirates both had the lowest attendance numbers with approximately 3,000 and 6,000 attendances respectively. The final match between Japan and Australia saw as many as 3,000 to 10,000 fans with valid tickets denied entry to the stadium which then allegedly sparked small skirmishes among fans, "It was just incredibly badly handled. There were kids and families, not causing any problem, being confronted by riot police and being told they weren't getting in", according to Andy Richardson, Al Jazeera's sports correspondent. The AFC stated that the gates were closed early for security concerns and organisers did not anticipate an influx of Japanese and Australian fans. The organising committee has offered to refund all tickets not redeemed at the match.

After staging the 2006 Asian Games, this Asian Cup was being closely watched as an indicator to see how Qatar copes with hosting a major international football tournament in preparation for the 2022 FIFA World Cup.

References

External links

AFC Asian Cup 2011 Official Site (Archived)
2011 AFC Asian Cup at soccerway.com

 
2011
2011
Asia
2010–11 in Qatari football
January 2011 sports events in Asia